Samantha Head (born 28 February 1973) is an English professional golfer with two Ladies European Tour (LET) wins.

Head was born in Ascot, Berkshire and her twin sister Johanna is also a professional golfer. She joined the Ladies European Tour in 1995 and won two individual tournaments on it, the Ladies Italian Open and South African Ladies Masters. Head was also runner-up at the Chrysler Open, Ladies Central European Open and SAS Masters and finished top-10 on the 2000 Ladies European Tour Order of Merit.

Head featured in the ninth season of The Big Break in 2008. Her first daughter Amy was born in April 2010 and she retired from tour.

Professional wins (2)

Ladies European Tour wins (2)

References

External links

English female golfers
Ladies European Tour golfers
Sportspeople from Berkshire
1973 births
Living people